Lermanda is a hamlet and council located in the municipality of Vitoria-Gasteiz, in Álava province, Basque Country, Spain. As of 2020, it has a population of 20.

Geography 

References

Populated places in Álava